The All-Ireland Senior Hurling Championship of 1964 was the 78th staging of Ireland's premier hurling knock-out competition.  Tipperary won the championship, beating Kilkenny 5-13 to 2-8 in the final at Croke Park, Dublin.

The championship

Format

Munster Championship

First round: (2 matches) These are two matches between the first four teams drawn from the province of Munster.  Two teams are eliminated at this stage while the two winners advance to the semi-finals.

Semi-finals: (2 matches) The winners of the two first round games join the other two Munster teams to make up the semi-final pairings.  Two teams are eliminated at this stage while the winners advance to the final.

Final: (1 match) The winner of the two semi-finals contest this game.  One team is eliminated at this stage while the winners advance to the All-Ireland final.

Leinster Championship

First round: (2 matches) These are two matches between the first four teams drawn from the province of Leinster.  Two teams are eliminated at this stage while the two winners advance to the second round.

Second round: (1 match) This is a single match between the two winners of the first round.  One team is eliminated at this stage while the winners advance to the semi-finals.

Semi-finals: (2 matches) The winner of the second round joins the other three Leinster teams to make up the semi-final pairings.  Two teams are eliminated at this stage while the winners advance to the final.

Final: (1 match) The winner of the two semi-finals contest this game.  One team is eliminated at this stage while the winners advance to the All-Ireland final.

All-Ireland Championship

Final: (1 match) The champions of Munster and Leinster contest this game.

Fixtures

Leinster Senior Hurling Championship

Munster Senior Hurling Championship

All-Ireland Senior Hurling Championship

Championship statistics

Miscellaneous

 Tipperary win their 20th All-Ireland title to become outright leaders on the all-time roll of honour for the first time since 1937.

Top scorers

Season

Single game

Player facts

Debutantes
The following players made their début in the 1969 championship:

References

 Corry, Eoghan, The GAA Book of Lists (Hodder Headline Ireland, 2005).
 Donegan, Des, The Complete Handbook of Gaelic Games (DBA Publications Limited, 2005).
 Sweeney, Éamonn, Munster Hurling Legends (The O'Brien Press, 2002).

See also

1964